Steve Kamb is an American fitness instructor, publisher and writer best known for promoting health and wellness at the website and fitness center NerdFitness.com.

Education 
Kamb attended Vanderbilt University from 2002–2006 and obtained a Bachelor's degree in economics.

Career 
Kamb worked in the marketing department for Sixthman from December 2007 – June 2010. During that time he helped write 697 articles for their company.

In June 2010, he officially quit his job at Sixthman to focus on his own company called Nerd Fitness. Since then he has been a guest speaker for Health@Google and been featured on Gizmodo.

Books 
Kamb has published three digital health and fitness e-books:
 Rebel Strength Guide
 Rebel Fitness Guide
 Rebel Running Guide

These programs are no longer available, and have been replaced by the Nerd Fitness Academy.

In 2015, Kamb released Nerd Fitness Yoga, a beginner's yoga digital guide.

Kamb's first published book, Level Up Your Life, was released on January 12, 2016 by Rodale Books.

References

External links 
 

People from Nashville, Tennessee
Vanderbilt University alumni
People from Sandwich, Massachusetts
American exercise instructors
American exercise and fitness writers
Writers from Massachusetts
American health and wellness writers
1984 births
Living people